Coat of arms of London may refer to

Coat of arms of the City of London
Coat of arms of London County Council
Coat of arms of the Greater London Council
Logo of the Greater London Authority